Karel Cornelia Constantijn Dillen (16 October 1925 – 27 April 2007) was a far-right Belgian politician and Flemish nationalist.

Life
According to Paul Beliën, editor of the Brussels Journal, "Dillen came from a non-political background. His father, an Antwerp labourer, abandoned his wife and their two sons when Dillen was still a baby. He was raised by his mother. Neither he, nor his brother nor his mother were involved in any political activities at all during the war,..."

In 1977 he established the Vlaams Nationale Partij (Flemish National Party), which became Vlaams Blok at the elections of 1978. He was president of the Vlaams Blok (later reformed as Vlaams Belang) until he appointed Frank Vanhecke as his successor in 1996.

Karel Dillen was a Member of the European Parliament (MEP) between 1994 and 2004, and vice-chairman of the Technical Fraction of the European Right, together with among others Jean-Marie Le Pen and Franz Schönhuber.

Holocaust denial
Karel Dillen had a history of associating with far-right figures.  Though he was not an active Nazi collaborator during the Second World War himself, he described himself as a "passive" collaborator.  He also translated in 1951 the pamphlet Nuremberg ou la terre promise ("Nuremberg or the Promised Land"), a Holocaust denial book by Maurice Bardèche. Afterwards, Dillen maintained regular contact with the author. The book states that the Nazi concentration camps were mock-ups built with the help of Hollywood after World War II.

References

1925 births
2007 deaths
Politicians from Antwerp
Flemish activists
Vlaams Belang MEPs
MEPs for Belgium 1989–1994
MEPs for Belgium 1994–1999
MEPs for Belgium 1999–2004